Flemming Lentfer (born 1 March 1964, Copenhagen) is a Danish General and the current Chief of Defence since 1 December 2020. Prior to Lentfer becoming Chief of Defence, he served as Director for the Danish Defence Acquisition and Logistics Organization and National Armaments Director.

Education and Background
Lentfer entered the Royal Danish Military Academy in 1983 and graduated in 1985. He then went to the Royal Danish Air Force Academy in 1985 and graduated in 1988. In 1991 he took the Junior Staff Course at Royal Danish Defence College. Later in 1991, he began taking the Officer's Advanced Course at the Royal Danish Air Force Academy which he finished in 1992. In 1995 he went back to the Royal Danish Air Force Academy to take the Senior Staff Course which he completed in 1996.

On 1988–1993, he served at the SAM Squadron 541, and served as a Staff Officer at the Defence Command from 1993 to 1995. He served as a syndicate leader and instructor on operations and logistics at the Royal Danish Defence College from 1996 to 1998, and served as Secretary in the Danish Defence Commission. In 1999 - 2000, he served at the Ministry of Defence as a Staff Officer, and served at the Head of Branch at of Royal Danish Air Force Academy.

He became the commander of the HAWK Battalion West from 2000 to 2002, and served at the Head of Plans and Programmes Branch at the Defence Command from 2002 to 2005. He became the Chief of Plans and Programmes Division at the Defence Command from 2005 to 2010, and served at the Defence Acquisition and Logistics Organisation, Chief of Acquisition and Planning Organization from 2010 to 2011. He returned to the Defence Command to serve as the Chief of Staff, Policy and Coordination, from 2011 to 2015, and served as Defence Command Denmark, Chief Joint Operations from 2015 to 2017.

He served as the Director, Danish Ministry of Defence Acquisition and Logistics, Organisation and National Armaments from 2017 to 2020, before being appointed as the Chief of Defence since 1 December 2020.

Effective dates of promotion

Awards and decorations
Lentfer has been awarded:

References

	

Living people
Danish generals
20th-century Danish military personnel
21st-century Danish military personnel
1964 births
Military personnel from Copenhagen
Commandeurs of the Légion d'honneur
Commanders of the Order of the Dannebrog